The Ukrainian Ground Forces, also known as the Ukrainian army, are the land forces of Ukraine and one of the five branches of the Armed Forces of Ukraine. They were formed from Ukrainian units of the Soviet Army after Ukrainian independence, and trace their ancestry to the 1917-22 army of the Ukrainian People's Republic.

After the dissolution of the Soviet Union in 1991, Ukraine retained its Soviet-era army equipment. The Armed Forces were systematically downsized after 1991 and as a result, it was largely dilapidated by July 2014. Since the start of the war in Donbas in April 2014 in eastern Ukraine, Ukraine embarked on a program to enlarge and modernize its Armed Forces. Its size of 129,950 in March 2014 had grown to 204,000 active personnel in May 2015, with the Ground Forces branch having 169,000 soldiers as of 2016. In 2016, 75% of the army consisted of contract servicemen. Ukraine's ground forces have also received more modern tanks, APCs, and many other types of combat equipment.

History
Today's Ukrainian Army traces its ancestry to the Ukrainian People's Army of 1917-21. It fought in the Ukrainian War of Independence (the Ukrainian-Soviet War), the Southern Front of the Russian Civil War, the Polish–Ukrainian War, and the Polish-Soviet War.

Collapse of the USSR

Upon their establishment in 1991, the Armed Forces of Ukraine included approximately 780,000 personnel, 7,000 armored vehicles, 6,500 tanks, and 2,500 tactical nuclear missiles. A problem that Ukraine faced was that while it had vast armed forces, it lacked a proper command structure. On 24 August 1991, the Verkhovna Rada of Ukraine ratified a resolution taking control of all military units of the former Soviet Armed Forces situated on the territory of Ukraine. This established the Ministry of Defence of Ukraine.

Creation of the Ground Forces
Following the declaration of Ukrainian independence in 1991, Ukraine inherited the 1st Guards Army, 13th Army, 38th Army, two tank armies (the 6th Guards Tank Army and the 8th Tank Army), and the 32nd Army Corps at Simferopol. The 28th Guards Motor Rifle Division and the 180th Rifle Division were left in Ukraine, having been previously under the 14th Guards Army headquartered at Tiraspol in the Moldovan SSR. The post of commander of ground troops was designated in early 1992. By the end of 1992, the Kyiv Military District disbanded, and Ukraine used its structures as the basis for the Ministry of Defence and the General Staff.

Between June and August 1993, the first redesignation of armies to army corps appears to have taken place. While the chief of ground forces post had been created in early 1992, it was over two years before the first holder, Colonel General Vasily Sobkov, was appointed on 7 April 1994. The legal framework for the Ground Forces was defined in Article 4 of the law 'On the Armed Forces of Ukraine.' At that time, the Ground Forces had no separate command body, and were directly subordinate to the Ukrainian General Staff.

The creation of the Ground Forces as a separate armed service was enacted by Presidential Decree 368/96 of 23 May 1996, 'On the Ground Forces of Ukraine.' That year both the Ground Forces Command was formed and the 1st Army Corps was reorganised as the Northern Territorial Operational Command (which became the Northern Operational Command in 1998). In 1997 the Carpathian Military District was reorganised as the Western Operational Command.From 1992 to 1997, the forces of the Kyiv MD were transferred to the Odesa MD, and the Odesa MD's headquarters moved to Donetsk. A new 2nd Army Corps was formed in the Odesa MD. Armies were converted to army corps, and motor rifle divisions converted into mechanised divisions or brigades. Pairs of attack helicopter regiments were combined to form army aviation brigades.

President Leonid Kuchma revealed in a December 1996 speech that as many as 191 mechanised infantry and tank battalions were rated not ready, adding,"This is especially dangerous in the forward-based units securing the nation's borders."

Reform
Under a plan promulgated in 2000 the Ground Forces were to reduce the number of troops from the then 300,000 to 240,000 by 2015, and an ultimate change from a partial conscript-based force to a fully professional military. The Armed Forces received little more than half of the Hr 68 million it was promised for reform in 2001, but managed to disband nine regiments and close 21 local military bases.

In 2005–06, the Northern Operational Command was reorganised as Territorial Directorate "North". It was tasked with territorial defence, mobilisation training, and preparation of reserves.

From 1991 the Ukrainian Ground Forces bought its military equipment only from Russia and other CIS states, as well as locally producing some of their own equipment. Until 2014 and the start of the war in Donbas, the defence industry in Ukraine produced equipment mostly for export.

Russian occupation of Crimea

In the aftermath of the 2014 Ukrainian Revolution, Russian special forces in unmarked uniforms began surrounding Ukrainian military bases on the Crimean peninsula before capturing them individually using a mixture of attrition and threats. Over the following weeks the Russian Armed Forces consolidated control of the peninsula and established road blocks to cut off the possibility of Ukraine sending reinforcements from the mainland. The takeover of Crimea was largely bloodless, as the Ukrainian soldiers didn't retaliate. By the end of March, all remaining Ukrainian troops were ordered to pull out of Crimea.

The Ukrainian Army was considered to be in a poor state during and after the annexation, with only 6,000 of its troops ready for combat and many of its vehicles lacking batteries. After Russia's annexation only 6,000 of the 20,300 Ukrainian soldiers stationed in Crimea before the annexation left the peninsula. The rest stayed in Crimea and defected to Russia.

Russo-Ukrainian War

War in Donbas (2014–2022)

In the early months of the war in Donbas that erupted in 2014 the Armed Forces were widely criticised for their poor equipment and inept leadership, forcing Internal Affairs Ministry forces like the National Guard and the territorial defence battalions to take on the brunt of the fighting in the first months of the war.

By February 2018 the Ukrainian armed forces were larger and better equipped, numbering 200,000 active-service military personnel. Most of the volunteer soldiers of the territorial defence battalions were integrated into the official Ukrainian army.

Within the reporting period of 16 November 2017 to 15 February 2018 a United Nations OHCHR  monitoring mission documented 115 cases of credible allegations of human rights abuses committed  on  both sides of the contact line. The nature of the crimes ranges from enforced disappearances, looting of civilian property, torture, rape and sexual violence up to political repression and extrajudicial killings.

Full-scale Russian invasion 

On 24 February 2022, Russia began a full-scale invasion of Ukraine. The Ground Forces have been participants of most of the land combat actions of the current war. The influx of Western materiel and supplies to the branch before and during the conflict as well as mobilization efforts have resulted in a massive expansion of the force, in addition to ongoing force modernization.

Military training and education centers

Training in 2006 was aimed at developing mobility and combat readiness of the forces. The Ukrainian armed forces took advantage of the opportunities provided by UN exercises and exercises where Ukraine and NATO nations and other partners participated.

Training resulted in 6,000 combat-ready troops in the spring of 2014 of Ukraine's (then) 129,950 active military personnel. In 2016 the Ukrainian army had more than 200,000 combat-ready soldiers of its 260,000 active personnel.

In 2015 Ukraine, the United States, the United Kingdom and Canada established the Joint Multinational Training Group – Ukraine (JMTG-U) and they set up three new training sites, in Khmelnytskyi, Kamianets-Podilskyi, and Yavoriv. The latter, known as the International Center for Peacekeeping and Security or the Yavoriv Combat Training Center, was hit by eight Russian missiles in March 2022.

It appears that the SAS has left behind forces to train Ukrainian soldiers. At least two of the officers from the SAS were confirmed as having been in Ukraine. Each posted with a different battalion near Kyiv. There emphasis has been training Ukrainian soldiers how to use the Anglo-Swedish NLAW. Other soldiers have actually been trained in the UK, according to the article. It would appear that the training course is approximately two weeks long for each participant.

This follows an earlier report of UK special forces being left behind in Ukraine. This includes the SAS, Special Boat Service and Special Reconnaissance Regiment. The other contributors appear to be unnamed special forces from Eastern European countries. These forces are training the Ukrainian military in sabotage, counter-insurgency and sniping.

Education centers
In 2007 the system of exercise/training ranges was optimized, decreasing their number and providing a specialized role.

Schooling occurs at:
 169th Training Center – (Chernihiv) – Home to army initial training, for all personnel entering the Army, it also houses the 169th Teaching Brigade which specializes in the tactics and skills of tankers and mechanized/motorized infantrymen.
 Hetman Petro Sahaidachnyi National Ground Forces Academy – (Lviv) – Is an academy for all officer cadets seeking a commission, an equivalent of the American West Point and British Sandhurst.
 Ivan Chernyakhovsky National Defense University of Ukraine – (Kyiv  – Teaches specializations like foreign languages, book keeping, cryptology, study of armaments, logistics, etc.
 Ivan Bohun Military High School – (Kyiv) – A JROTC style boarding school which has a curriculum identical to Ukraine's public schools with added focus on military teachings and discipline.
 Korolev Signals Institute – (Zhytomyr) – Teaches theory and practice of electromagnetic waves and their uses in communication, radio location, eavesdropping, and jamming.
 Military Institute of Telecommunications and Information Technologies – (Kyiv) – Teaches the subjects: Computer Science, Systems engineering, Telecommunications, Security Information and Communication Systems, Systems of technical protection of information, Electronic military administration.
 Odesa Artillery Academy

Training ranges are at:

Branches of the Ground Forces

Armoured and mechanised forces

Mechanised Infantry and armoured forces are the primary components of the Ukrainian Ground Forces. Their primary objectives in case of war are capturing and holding targets, maintaining positions, defending against attack, penetrating enemy lines and defeating enemy forces.

The mechanised and armoured forces are equipped with a combination of Soviet-made (part of them modernized) and modern Ukrainian armored vehicles which includes T-80, T-64, (T-64BV Model 2017, T-64BV), T-64BM "Bulat" and T-72UA1 main battle tanks, BTR-4, BTR-60, BTR-70 and BTR-80 wheeled armored personnel carriers and BMP-1, BMP-2 and BMD-2 infantry combat vehicles.

Since the fall of the Soviet Union, a large number of the previous Soviet mechanised formations on Ukrainian soil have been disbanded – the IISS says totals have dropped from 14 divisions, in 1992, to two divisions, six brigades, and one independent regiment in 2008. Today, all mechanised and armoured formations are called brigades.

Mountain and Jager Brigades
The Ukrainian Ground Forces also include two mountain infantry brigades and the newly formed 61st Jager brigade, reformed from the 61st Motorized Infantry in 2019.

 10th Mountain Brigade
 128th Mountain Brigade
 61st Jager Infantry Brigade
 68th Jager Infantry Brigade (Reserve) (Formed in early 2022 in response to the 2022 Russian invasion of Ukraine)
 71st Jager Infantry Brigade (Reserve) (Formed in early 2022 in response to the 2022 Russian invasion of Ukraine)

Army Aviation 
Army Aviation provides reconnaissance, tactical fire support and air transport for the Ukrainian Ground Forces. As of 2017 Ukraine's army fields four Army Aviation brigades in an Army Aviation Command directly subordinated to the Ground Forces HQ:

 11th Army Aviation Brigade, Kherson
 12th Army Aviation Brigade, Novyi Kalyniv
 16th Army Aviation Brigade, Brody
 18th Army Aviation Brigade, Poltava

The Army Aviation's maintenance facility is the 57th Aviation Base in Brody. The service's equipment includes: Mi-2, Mi-8, Mi-9, Mi-24 and Mi-26 helicopters.

Rocket Forces and Artillery

Army Air Defence
The Army Air Defence units are responsible for protecting troops against enemy air attacks anywhere on the battlefield, and while in combat. The Ukrainian Ground Forces army air defence branch is equipped with a variety of effective surface-to-air missile systems of division level and anti-aircraft missile and artillery complexes of regiment level. Regiment level units are characterized by their high rate of fire, vitality, maneuverability, and capability of action under all conditions of modern combat arms operations. Surface-to-air missile systems and complexes of division level are characterized by their long range and firepower and are equipped with surface-to-air missile complexes; S-300V, Osa, Buk, Buk-M1 and Tor. While anti-aircraft missile and artillery complexes that are of regiment level are equipped with the Tunguska-M1, Igla MANPADS system, Strela, and Shilka anti-aircraft missile systems.The army's only separate radar system, meaning it isn't a part of any anti-aircraft system, is the Ukrainian Kolchuga-M. It was designed sometime between the years 1993–1997, the system is said to be one of the most advanced passive sensors in the world, as it is claimed to be able to detect stealth aircraft.

Structure
The Donbas war caused a radical reform of the Ukrainian Armed Forces in the general and the Ukrainian Ground Forces in particular. It built and expanded on the 2011 structure. As of 2022 the structure is the following:

Ground Forces Command of the Ukrainian Armed Forces (Military Unit [MU] А0105), Kyiv.

Senior command personnel:

 Commander of the Ground Forces: General/Lieutenant-General
 Deputy Commander of the Ground Forces: Lieutenant-General/Major-General
 Chief of Staff and Deputy Commander of the Ground Forces: Major-General
 Commander of Territorial Defence Forces of the Ground Forces Command: Major-General
 Commander of Logistics of the Ground Forces Command: Brigadier General
 Chief Sergeant-Major of the Ground Forces: Command Master Sergeant

Formations and units directly subordinated to the Ground Forces Command:

 1004th Security and Service Battalion (MU А1937) - Kyiv
 President's Own [Guards] Brigade 'Hetman Bohdan Khmelnytsky (MU А0222) - Kyiv 
 148th Intelligence Command Center (MU А0189) - Kyiv
 96th Intelligence Center for Surveillance of Radio-Emitting Space Objects (MU А2571) - Velykyi Dalnyk, Odesa Oblast
 169th Mobile Repair Technical Base (MU А1405) - Kanatove railway station near Vysoki Bairaky, Kirovohrad Oblast
 3568th Air Defence Technical Missile Base (MU А4009) - Starokostiantyniv, Ivano-Frankivsk Oblast
 other units
 Missile Troops and Artillery of the Ground Forces - Commander of Missile Troops and Artillery and Deputy Commander of the Ground Forces: Lieutenant-General/Major-General
 19th Missile Zaporozhian Brigade 'Saint Barbara (MU А4239) - Khmelnytskyi, Khmelnytskyi Oblast, armed with the Tochka-U missile complex
 107th Rocket Artillery Brigade (MU А1546) - Kremenchuk, Poltava Oblast, armed with the Vilkha missile complex
 27th Rocket Artillery Brigade 'Kish Otaman Petro Kalnyshevsky (MU А1476) - Sumy, Sumy Oblast, armed with the BM-27 Uragan
 43rd Artillery Brigade 'Hetman Taras Triasylo (MU А3085) - Divichki Pereyaslav village near Pyriatyn, Kyiv Oblast, armed with the 2S7 Pion
 15th Rocket Artillery Kyiv Regiment (MU А1108) - Drohobych, Lviv Oblast, armed with the BM-30 Smerch
 Army Aviation Directorate of the Ground Forces Command - Chief of Army Aviation of the Ground Forces Command — Major-General
 8th Army Aviation Command Post (MU А1710) - Chernihiv, Chernihiv Oblast
 11th Army Aviation Brigade 'Kherson (MU А1604) — Chornobayivka Air Base near Kherson, Kherson Oblast - Mi-24, Mi-8, Mi-2 
 12th Army Aviation Brigade 'Major-General Viktor Pavlenko (MU А3913) — Novyi Kalyniv, Lviv Oblast - Mi-24, Mi-26, Mi-8/9 
 16th Army Aviation Brigade 'Brody (MU А2595) - Brody, Lviv Oblast - Mi-24, Mi-8, Mi-2 
 18th Army Aviation Brigade 'Igor Sikorsky (MU А3384) - Poltava, Poltava Oblast - Mi-24, Mi-8, Mi-2 
 57th Aviation Base [for maintenance, repair and supply of the army aviation] (MU А3595) - Brody, Lviv Oblast
 Territorial Defence Forces Command - Commander of Territorial Defence [Forces] of the Ground Forces Command — Major-General
 Information and Telecommunications Nod of the TDFC - Kyiv
 support units directly subordinated to the TDFC 
 four territorial defence directorates under the four regional commands of the ground forces. Manoeuver elements include territorial defence brigades, made up of territorial defence battalions and support units and stand-alone separate rifle battalions. Each Ukrainian oblast is covered by its own Territorial Defence Zone, which commands one separate territorial defence brigade and one separate rifle battalion of higher mobility and readiness. In January 2022 the Ukrainian Ministry of Defence has publicised information about its plans for the expansion of the territorial defence forces. The composition of the Territorial Defende Forces (Сил ТрО ЗСУ) should reach 25 brigades for the 25 regions ('один регіон – одна бригада', English: 'one region – one brigade', for the 24 Oblasts and the capitol city of Kyiv) with up to 150 battalions ('один батальйон на район or 'one battalion per raion') for a peacetime strength of up to 10 000 people and over 130 000 upon wartime mobilisation.

 Educational institutionsTraining establishments units directly subordinated to the Ground Forces Command:

 [[Hetman Petro Sahaidachnyi National Ground Forces Academy|National Academy of the Ground Forces 'Hetman Petro Sahaidachnyi]] - Lviv, Lviv Oblast
 officer cadets training establishments:
 Faculty of Combat Application of the Forces 
 Faculty of Combined Arms 
 Faculty of Missile Troops and Artillery 
 Faculty for Preparation of Combat (Operational) Support Specialists 
 NCO Personnel Military College 
 International Peacekeeping and Security Center (MU А4150)
 Combat Training Center for Military Units 
 Opposing Force Battalion 
 Imitation and Modelling Simulation Center
 184th Training Center (MU А2615) - Starichi village, Lviv Oblast
 355th Mechanized Training Regiment (MU А3211)
 Tank Training Battalion
 356th Artillery Training Regiment (MU А3618)
 School of Self-Propelled Artillery 
 School of Towed Artillery 
 School of Anti-Tank Artillery 
 Mortar School 
 49th Intelligence Training Center (MU А4138)
 Engineer Training Battalion
 Imitation and Modelling Simulation Center 
 138th Logistical Training Battalion (MU А2600)
 School for Initial and Refresher Training of Fire-Fighting Specialists 
 other departments (інші підрозділи)
 Odesa Military Academy - Odesa, Odesa Oblast
 Armoured Forces Military Institute 'Verkhovna Rada of Ukraine' - Military Faculty of the [[Kharkiv Polytechnic Institute|'Kharkiv Polytechnic Institute National Technical University]] 
 169th Training Centre, Desna
 300th Tank Training Regiment
 354th Mechanized Training Regiment
 6th Artillery Training Regiment, Divychky
 507th Maintenance Training Battalion
 718th Transport Training Battalion
 1121st Anti-aircraft Missile Artillery Training Regiment
 , Starychi
 
 355th Mechanized Training Regiment
 356th Artillery Training Regiment
 Tank Training Battalion
 138th Material Supply Training Battalion
 Anti-Tank Missile Specialists School
 other units

 Operational Command West 
The Operational Command West (MU А0796) is headquartered in Rivne and has an area of responsibility covering the Volyn, Zakarpattia, Ivano-Frankivsk, Lviv, Rivne, Ternopil, Khmelnytskyi and Chernivtsi Oblasts.Headquarters, Rivne

Combat support units:
7th Combat Command Group, Rivne, Rivne Oblast
 394th Security and Service Battalion, Rivne, Rivne Oblast
 224th Automobile Battalion, Rivne, Rivne Oblast
 55th Signals Regiment, Rivne, Rivne Oblast
 346th Information and Telecommunications Nod 
 146th Intelligence Command Center
 Regional Center for Electronic Intelligence 'West 436th Electronic Warfare Nod 
 201st Electronic Warfare Company 
 111th NBC Surveillance and Analysis Station 
 124th Joint Logistical Support Center 
 146th Repair and Overhaul Regiment, Zolochiv
 182nd Material Supply Battalion 
 233rd Combined Arms Training Range
 90th Base for Artillery Ammunitions
 other specialised and logistical units
 Military comissariates
 Territorial centers for recruitment and social policy implementation

Combat units:
14th Mechanized Brigade 'Roman the Great (MU A2331), Volodymyr-Volynsky, Volyn Oblast
 24th Mechanized Brigade 'King Daniel (MU A0998), Yavoriv, Lviv Oblast
 10th Mountain Assault Brigade (MU A4267), Kolomyia, Ivano Frankivsk Oblast
 128th Mountain Assault [[Zakarpattia Lowland|'Zakarpattia]] Brigade (MU A1556), Mukachevo, Zakarpattia Oblast
 44th Artillery Brigade 'Danylo Apostol (MU A1428), Ternopil, Ternopil Oblast
 39th Air Defence Missile Regiment, Volodymyr-Volynsky, Volyn Oblast
 703rd Operational Support [Engineer] Regiment, Sambir, Lviv Oblast
 130th Reconnaissance Battalion, Dubno, Rivne Oblast

Territorial defence units:Regional Directorate [of Territorial Defence] 'West', Rivne, Rivne Oblast
 Information and Telecommunications Nod of Regional Directorate 'West, Rivne, Rivne Oblast
 Security and Service Company of Regional Directorate 'West, Rivne, Rivne Oblast
 Territorial Defence Zone of the Volyn Oblast
 2nd Rifle Battalion 
 100th 'Volyn Territorial Defence Brigade (cadred) (MU А7028)
 Territorial Defence Zone of the Rivne Oblast 
 14th Rifle Battalion 
 [[104th Territorial Defense Brigade (Ukraine)|104th 'Rivne Territorial Defence Brigade]] (cadred) (MU А7032)
 Territorial Defence Zone of the Lviv Oblast 
 10th Rifle Battalion 
 [[103rd Separate Territorial Defense Brigade|103rd 'Lviv Territorial Defence Brigade]] (cadred) (MU А7031)
 Territorial Defence Zone of the Ternopil Oblast 
 16th Rifle Battalion 
 105th <nowiki/>'Ternopil''' Territorial Defence Brigade (cadred) (MU А7033)
 Territorial Defence Zone of the Khmelnytsky Oblast
 19th  Rifle Battalion
 Territorial Defence Zone of the Zakarpattia Oblast 
 5th Rifle Battalion 
 101st 'Zakarpattian Territorial Defence Brigade (cadred) (MU А7029)
 Territorial Defence Zone of the Ivano-Frankivsk Oblast
 7th Rifle Battalion 
 102nd 'Ivano-Frankivsk Territorial Defence Brigade (cadred) (MU А7030)
 Territorial Defence Zone of the Chernivtsi Oblast 
 21st Rifle Battalion 
 107th 'Chernivtsi Territorial Defence Brigade (cadred) (MU А7035)

 Operational Command North 
The Operational Command North (MU 4583) is headquartered in Chernihiv and has an area of responsibility covering the Zhytomyr, Kyiv, Poltava, Sumy, Cherkasy and Chernihiv Oblasts and the capital city of Kyiv.

Headquarters,  Chernihiv

Combat support units:

9th Combat Command Group, Chernihiv, Chernihiv Oblast
134th Security and Service Battalion (MU А1624), Chernihiv, Chernihiv Oblast
226th Automobile Battalion (MU А2927), Berdychiv, Zhytomyr Oblast
5th Signal Regiment (MU А2995), Chernihiv, Chernihiv Oblast
367th Information and Telecommunications Nod (MU А2984), Chernihiv, Chernihiv Oblast
90th Intelligence Command Center 
Regional ELINT Center 'North (MU А2622), Chernihiv, Chernihiv Oblast
121st Maneuver ELINT Center (MU А1783), Chernihiv, Chernihiv Oblast
122nd ELINT Center (MU А1993), Chuhuiv, Kharkiv Oblast
20th Electronic Warfare Battalion (MU А1262), Zhytomyr, Zhytomyr Oblast 
12th Operational Support [Engineer] Regiment (MU А3814), Novohrad-Volynskyi, Zhytomyr Oblast 
107th NBC Surveillance and Analysis Station 
125th Topographic Unit 
229th Joint Logistical Support Center 
50th Repair and Overhaul Regiment (MU А1586), Huiva, Zhytomyr Oblast
181st Material Supply Battalion (MU A2925), Novohrad-Volynskyi, Zhytomyr Oblast
other specialised and logistical units 
1322nd Artillery Ammunitions Base 
242nd Combined Arms Training Range 
Military comissariates (військові комісаріати)
 Territorial centers for recruitment and social policy implementation

Combat units:

 1st Tank Brigade 'Severia (MU А1815), Honcharivske, Chernihiv Oblast 
 12th Tank Battalion (MU А0932), Honcharivske, Chernihiv Oblast
 30th Mechanized Brigade 'Knyaz Konstanty Ostrogski (MU A0409), Novohrad-Volynskyi, Zhytomyr Oblast 
 58th Motorized Infantry Brigade 'Hetman Ivan Vyhovsky (MU А1376), Konotop, Sumy Oblast 
 61st Jager Infantry Brigade 'Stepov' (MU unidentified), Chernihiv, Chernihiv Oblast
 72nd Mechanized Brigade 'Black Zaporizhians (MU А2167), Bila Tserkva, Kyiv Oblast область 
 26th Artillery Brigade 'Major-General Roman Dashkevich (MU А3091), Berdychiv, Zhytomyr Oblast 
 1129th Bila Tserkva Air Defence Missile Regiment (MU А1232), Bila Tserkva, Kyiv Oblast 
 54th Reconnaissance Battalion 'Mykhailo Tisha (MU А2076), Novohrad-Volynskyi, Zhytomyr Oblast 
 possibly a security company based at Kyiv Boryspil Airport

Territorial defence units:
Regional Directorate [of Territorial Defence] 'North', Kyiv

 Information and Telecommunications Nod of Regional Directorate 'North, Kyiv
 Security and Service Company of Regional Directorate 'North, Kyiv
 Territorial Defence Zone of the City of Kyiv 
 ? Rifle Battalion 
 112th 'City of Kyiv Territorial Defence Brigade (cadred) (MU А7040)
 Territorial Defence Zone of the Kyiv Oblast 
 8th Rifle Battalion 
 114th 'Kyiv Oblast Territorial Defence Brigade (cadred) (MU А7042)
 Territorial Defence Zone of the Zhytomyr Oblast
 4th Rifle Battalion 
 115th 'Zhytomyr Territorial Defence Brigade (cadred) (MU А7043)
 Territorial Defence Zone of the Poltava Oblast 
 13th Rifle Battalion 
 116th 'Poltava Territorial Defence Brigade (cadred) (MU А7044) 
 Territorial Defence Zone of the Sumy Oblast 
 15th Rifle Battalion 
 117th 'Sumy Territorial Defence Brigade (cadred) (MU А7045)
 Territorial Defence Zone of the Cherkasy Oblast 
 20th Rifle Battalion 
 118th 'Cherkasy Territorial Defence Brigade (cadred) (MU А7046)
 Territorial Defence Zone of the Chernihiv Oblast 
 22nd Rifle Battalion 
 119th 'Chernihiv Territorial Defence Brigade (cadred) (MU А7047)

 Operational Command South 
The Operational Command South (MU 2393) is headquartered in Odesa and has an area of responsibility covering the Vinnytsia, Kirovohrad, Mykolaiv, Odesa and Kherson Oblasts.

Headquarters, Odesa

Combat support units:

 10th Combat Command Group, Odesa, Odesa Oblast
 363rd Security and Service Battalion (MU А1785), Odesa, Odesa Oblast
 225th Automobile Battalion, Odesa, Odesa Oblast
 7th Signal Regiment (MU А3783), Odesa, Odesa Oblast
 64th Information and Telecommunications Nod (MU А1283), Odesa, Odesa Oblast
 91st Intelligence Command Center (MU А2152) 
 Regional ELINT Center 'South (MU А3438) 
 78th ELINT Center (MU А2395) 
 79th ELINT Center (MU А2412) 
 82nd Manoeuver ELINT Center (MU А2444) 
 23rd Electronic Warfare Company 
 16th Operational Support [Engineer] Regiment
 108th NBC Surveillance and Analysis Station 
 46th Joint Logistical Support Center
 31st Repair and Overhaul Regiment 
 183rd Material Supply Battalion
 1513th Artillery Ammunitions Base
 235th Joint Forces for Preparation of Military Units and Sub-Units 
 241st Combined Arms Training Range 
 other specialised and logistical units
 Military comissariates 
 Territorial centers for recruitment and social policy implementation

Combat units:

 28th Mechanized Brigade 'Participants in the First Winter Campaign (MU А0666), Chornomorske, Odesa Oblast  
 56th Motorized Infantry 'Mariupol Brigade (MU А0989), Mariupol, Donetsk Oblast 
 57th Motorized Infantry Brigade 'Kosh otaman Kost Hordiyenko (MU В4533), Nova Kakhovka, Kherson Oblast 
 59th Motorized Infantry Brigade 'Yakіv Gandzyuk (MU А1619), Haisyn, Vinnytsia Oblast 
 40th Artillery Brigade 'Grand Knyaz Vytautas' (MU А2227), Pervomaisk, Mykolaiv Oblast 
 38th Air Defence Missile Regiment 'Major-General Yuriy Tyutyunnyk (MU А3880), Nova Odesa, Mykolaiv Oblast
 131st Reconnaissance Battalion (MU В1109), Gushchintsy, Vinnytsia Oblast 
 143rd Reconnaissance Battalion (MU В1053), unidentified location, Mykolaiv Oblast

Territorial defence units:Regional Directorate [of Territorial Defence] 'South', Odesa, Odesa Oblast

Information and Telecommunications Nod of Regional Directorate 'South, Odesa, Odesa Oblast
 Security and Service Company of Regional Directorate 'South, Odesa, Odesa Oblast
 Territorial Defence Zone of the Vinnytsia Oblast 
1st Rifle Battalion 
120th 'Vinnytsia Territorial Defence Brigade (cadred) (MU А7048)
Territorial Defence Zone of the Kirovohrad Oblast
9th Rifle Battalion 
121st 'Kirovohrad Territorial Defence Brigade (cadred) (MU А7049)
Territorial Defence Zone of the Odesa Oblast 
12th Rifle Battalion 
122nd 'Odesa Territorial Defence Brigade (cadred) (MU А7051)
Territorial Defence Zone of the Mykolaiv Oblast
11th Rifle Battalion 
123rd 'Mykolaiv Territorial Defence Brigade (cadred) (MU А7052)
Territorial Defence Zone of the Kherson Oblast 
18th Rifle Battalion
124th 'Kherson Territorial Defence Brigade (cadred) (MU А7053)

 Operational Command East 
The Operational Command East (MU 1314) is headquartered in Dnipro and has an area of responsibility covering Dnipropetrovsk, Donetsk, Zaporizhzhia, Luhansk, and Kharkiv Oblasts with the Russian-occupied territory of the Crimea nominally attached to it as the Separate Ground Forces Area (Окремий військово-сухопутний район). OC East is the general command responsible for frontline regular UGF formations fighting in the War in Donbas and the current Russian invasion.Headquarters, Dnipro''' (as the result of war in Donbas, a split from the OC "South")

Combat support units:

 8th Combat Command Group, 
 133rd Security and Service Battalion (MU А3750), Dnipro, Dnipropetrovsk Oblast
227th Automobile Battalion (MU А1823), Kryvyi Rih, Dnipropetrovsk Oblast
 121st Signal Regiment (MU А1214), Cherkaske, Dnipropetrovsk Oblast 
 368th Information and Telecommunications Nod (MU А2326), Dnipro, Dnipropetrovsk Oblast
 188th Intelligence Command Center
 Regional ELINT Center 'East 
502nd Electronic Warfare Battalion (MU А1828), Cherkaske, Dnipropetrovsk Oblast 
91st Operational Support [Engineer] Regiment (MU А0563), Okhtyrka, Sumy Oblast 
 102nd NBC Surveillance and Analysis Station (102 розрахунково-аналітична станція)
532nd Repair and Overhaul Regiment (MU А3336)
218th Joint Logistical Support Center 
78th Material Supply Battalion (MU В4756), Kryvyi Rih, Dnipropetrovsk Oblast
222nd Central Artillery Ammunitions Base
239th Combined Arms Training Range 
other specialised and logistical units 
Military commissariats
 Territorial centers for recruitment and social policy implementation

Combat units:

 17th Kryvyi Rih Tank Brigade 'Konstantin Pestushko (MU А3283), Kryvyi Rih
 53rd Mechanized Brigade 'Knyaz Vladimir Monomakh (MU А0536), Sievierodonetsk, Luhansk Oblast 
 54th Mechanized Brigade 'Hetman Ivan Mazepa (MU А0693), Bakhmut, Donetsk Oblast 
 92nd Mechanized Brigade 'Kosh otaman Ivan Sirko (MU А0501), Chuhuiv, Kharkiv Oblast 
 93rd Mechanized Brigade 'Kholodny Yar (MU А1302), Cherkaske, Dnipropetrovsk Oblast 
 55th Artillery Brigade 'Zaporozhian Sich (MU А1978), Zaporizhia, Zaporizhzhia Oblast 
 1039th Air Defence Missile Regiment (MU А1964), Hvardiiske, Dnipropetrovsk Oblast 
 74th Reconnaissance Battalion (MU А1035), Cherkaske, Dnipropetrovsk Oblast 

Territorial defence units:

Regional Directorate [of Territorial Defence] 'East', Dnipro, Dnipropetrovsk Oblast

Information and Telecommunications Nod of Regional Directorate 'East, Dnipro, Dnipropetrovsk Oblast
 Security and Service Company of Regional Directorate 'East, Dnipro, Dnipropetrovsk Oblast
 Territorial Defence Zone of the Dnipropetrovsk Oblast 
 3rd Rifle Battalion 
 108th 'Dnipropetrovsk Territorial Defence Brigade (MU А7036)
 Territorial Defence Zone of the Kharkiv Oblast 
 17th Rifle Battalion 
 113th 'Kharkiv Territorial Defence Brigade (MU А7041)
 Territorial Defence Zone of the Zaporizhzhia Oblast
 6th Rifle Battalion (6-й окремий стрілецький батальйон)
110th 'Zaporizhzhia Territorial Defence Brigade (MUА7038)
Territorial Defence Zone of the Donetsk Oblast 
? Rifle Battalion 
109th 'Donetsk''' Territorial Defence Brigade (MU А7037)
Territorial Defence Zone of the Luhansk Oblast 
? Rifle Battalion 
111th 'Luhansk Territorial Defence Brigade (MU А7039)

Ground Forces Area - Russian-occupied Crimea peninsula, these structures exist only nominally:

Territorial Defence Zone of Sevastopol 
Rifle Battalion
Territorial Defence Brigade
Territorial Defence Zone of the Crimean Autonomous Republic 
Rifle Battalion 
Territorial Defence Brigade

Reserve Corps
Reserve Corps

 3rd Tank "Iron" Brigade
 4th Tank Brigade
 5th Tank Brigade
 14th Tank Brigade
 15th Mechanized Brigade
 33rd Mechanized Brigade
 45th Artillery Brigade
 60th Infantry Brigade "Inguletska"
 62nd Mechanized Brigade
 63rd Mechanized Brigade

The army's Reserve Corps (Ukrainian: Корпус резерву) is a new formation, directly subordinated to the General Staff. It is also called the Army Strategic Reserve Corps. Its main function is to prepare and administer the reservists of the ground forces. According to plans it should be fully operational by 2020 with reserve servicemen in three separate categories:
 Operational Reserve of the First Line (оперативний резерв першої черги) – by 2020 it should include about 50,000 reserve servicemen with extensive combat training (60 days of combat training every two years) in the reserve companies and batteries of the operational army brigades and regiments and those reservists are to become casualty replacements in wartime
 Operational Reserve of the Second Line (оперативний резерв другої черги) – it should include reserve servicemen with combat training of 30 days every two years in territorial defence brigades. In addition, the command personnel will undergo 10 days training cycles yearly. The 4th Army Corps should also act as the pool formation for those territorial brigades and transfer them to the ground forces' operational commands in wartime as needed.
 Mobilization Reserve (мобілізаційний резерв) – it should include all the Ukrainian citizens, who are eligible to mobilization in case of a war, but do not belong to the first or the second line operational reserve. They could be used to form support units or to boost the service numbers of the territorial brigades as casualty replacements.

In that organization the Reserve Corps is currently (2022) engaged in the ongoing Russian invasion of Ukraine, and its reservists have fought in every ground operation of the conflict.

 Geographic distribution 

 List of commanders 
Title "Commander-in-chief" 1992 – 2005, "Commander" 2005 – present

 1992–1994 no appointment (see above text)
 1994–1998 Colonel General Vasyl Tymofiiovych Sobkov
 1998–2001 Colonel General Petro Ivanovych Shuliak
 2001–2002 Colonel General Oleksandr Ivanovych Zatynaiko
 2002–2004 Colonel General Petro Ivanovych Shuliak
 2004–2006 Colonel General Mykola Mykolaiovych Petruk
 2006–2007 Lieutenant General Valerii Semenovych Frolov
 2007–2009 Colonel General Ivan Yuriiovych Svyda
 2009–2014 Colonel General Henadii Petrovych Vorobiov
 2014–2016 Lieutenant General Anatolii Savvatiiovych Pushniakov
 2016–2019 Colonel General Serhii Mikolaiovych Popko
 2019–present Colonel General Oleksandr Syrskyi

Military ranks
 As a non-member state, NATO rank codes are not used in Ukraine, they are presented here for reference purposes only

In the new uniforms the Ukrainian Ground Forces unveiled in August 2016 the stars that traditionally adorn shoulder straps have been replaced by diamonds. A new set of insignia are being adopted.

 General and officer ranks 

 Other ranks and NCOs 

Equipment

Uniforms
The Ukrainian Army unveiled its new uniforms on 24 August 2016 (Independence Day of Ukraine). The new uniforms are modeled on British military styles, having a modern pixelated digital camouflage pattern. They also incorporate details from the uniforms worn by the Ukrainian People's Army. The new cap includes an insignia of a Ukrainian Cossack grasping a cross.

Deployment outside of Ukraine

Iraq

Ukraine deployed a sizable contingent of troops to the Iraq War, these were stationed near Kut. Ukraine's troop deployment was the second largest of all former Soviet states besides Georgia and they deployed more soldiers to the nation then many members of NATO such as Estonia, Latvia, and Lithuania. Ukraine also suffered the fifth highest casualty toll during the war, with only Polish, Italian, UK, and US forces suffering heavier losses.

From 2003 to 2005 over 1,700 Ukrainian soldiers were deployed to Iraq, the third-largest contingent at the time, they were designated to the 5th Mechanized Brigade, as in Ukraine's mission to Kosovo the troops deployed were contract soldiers and not conscripts. Ukraine began to severely draw down its troop levels in Iraq in 2005 due to mounting casualties and the political toxicity of the conflict. By 2005 only 876 soldiers, roughly half of the original contingent were deployed, by years end troop levels dropped to below 100. In 2008, one year before the official end of the US military mission, President Viktor Yushchenko ordered all remaining troops deployed to Iraq to be returned home and Ukraine's mission to the nation officially over.

Afghanistan
Between 2001 and 2021, Ukraine allowed United States military cargo planes to fly over and refuel on Ukrainian soil on their way to Afghanistan. In 2007 Ukraine deployed a detachment of the 143rd De-mining Center of the Armed Forces of Ukraine to Afghanistan. Ukraine has kept a team of soldiers deployed to Afghanistan as part of ISAF since 2007, these mostly consisted of pilots, medical officers, and bomb disposal experts.

Ukrainian pilots were responsible for training the pilots of the Afghan Air Force on the operation of several air craft as Afghanistan's forces consisted of many Soviet designed aircraft such as the Mi-17, which Ukrainian troops were very familiar with. In 2013, the contingent of troops in Afghanistan totaled 26 troops. As of 2014 the Ukrainian contingent was further drawn down and the team included 8 bomb disposal experts and several medical officers.

Kosovo
Ukrainian forces have also been deployed to Kosovo since 2000 as part of the 600 man Polish–Ukrainian Peace Force Battalion. In August 2014, Ukraine ended its mission to Kosovo due to the 2014 Russian invasion of Ukraine.

Africa
Ukrainian peacekeeping forces have been deployed to the Democratic Republic of Congo, Liberia, Sudan and South Sudan and Cote d'Ivoire. Ukrainian forces have also been requested to take a more active role in the Northern Mali Conflict of 2012 in battling Islamic forces. One of the largest deployments is the 18th Separate Helicopter Unit of the Armed Forces of Ukraine which consisted of 160 servicemen and four Mi-24P helicopters and was deployed to the Democratic Republic of Congo in 2011.

Military decorations

Veterans
Ukraine provides combat veterans with various benefits. Ukrainians who have served in World War II, the Soviet–Afghan War, or as liquidators at the Chernobyl disaster are eligible for benefits such as a monthly allowance, a discount on medical and pharmacy services, free use of public transportation, additional vacation days from work, having priority for retention in case of work layoffs, easier loan access and approval process, preference when applying for security related positions, priority when applying to vocation school or trade school, and electricity, gas, and housing subsidies. Veterans are also eligible to stay at military sanatoriums, provided there is available space.

Since gaining independence, Ukraine has deployed troops to Kosovo, Iraq, and Afghanistan, gaining a new generation of veterans separate from those who served in the Soviet forces. Most recently the government passed a law extending veteran benefits to Ukrainian troops participating in the war in Donbas. Veterans from other nations who move to or reside in Ukraine may be eligible for some of the listed benefits. This provision was likely made to ensure that World War II, Chernobyl, and Afghanistan veterans from other Soviet states who moved to Ukraine received similar benefits. As Ukraine has participated in numerous NATO led conflicts since its independence it is unclear if NATO veterans would be extended these benefits.

Veteran groups are not as developed as in the United States which has numerous well known national organizations such as the Veterans of Foreign Wars. World War II veterans, and even persons who have lived through the war are generally treated with the highest respect. Other veterans are not as well known. Ukrainian veterans from the Soviet War of Afghanistan are strikingly similar to the Vietnam veterans of the United States, although the Soviet Union generally kept the public in the dark through the war, unlike in Vietnam, where coverage was very high. Afghanistan is often labeled as a mistake by the Soviet Union and its successor states, but the lack of media coverage, and the censorship through the war have ensured that many still remain unaware of their nation's involvement in the conflict. Despite Ukraine having the 3rd largest contingent of troops in Iraq in 2004, few also realize that their nation has many veterans of the Iraq war.

Soldiers that took part in the war in Donbas can receive free land plots.

On 22 November 2018 the (Ukrainian) Ministry for Veterans Affairs was officially established.

See also
 KMDB
 Malyshev Factory
 Military ranks of Ukraine
 Ukrspetsexport

Notes

 References 
 Citations 

 General sources 
 International Institute for Strategic Studies, The Military Balance 2006.
 Yuriy Yurchnya, 'The Armed Forces of Ukraine,' Geneva Centre for DCAF, 2010.

Further reading
 Ben Lombardi, Ukrainian armed forces: Defence expenditure and military reform, Journal of Slavic Military Studies'', Vol. 14, No. 3, version of record date 18 Dec 2007.
 James Sherr, "Ukraine's Defence Reform: An Update", Conflict Studies Research Centre, 2002

External links
 The Army of the Armed Forces of Ukraine at the Ministry of Defence of Ukraine
 Armament of Ukrainian Ground Forces at the Ministry of Defence of Ukraine
 Ukraine: Ground Forces Equipment
 Vepr Assault Rifle (archived 16 May 2007)
 The Ukrainian Army – uarmy.iatp.org.ua
 Analysis of the Ukrainian Security Policy
 Ukraine's strategic Defence bulletin (PDF)
 May 2016 analysis by Glen Grant, a former colonel in the British Army and lecturer at Riga Business School about powerfulness of Ukraine's armed forces, produced by 5 Kanal

 
1991 establishments in Ukraine
Armies by country
Military of Ukraine